Apollo High School is a High School located in Simi Valley, California, United States. Its goals are to provide "a safe, caring, and academically challenging environment in which students can grow academically and personally".

References

External links

Education in Simi Valley, California
High schools in Ventura County, California
Simi Valley Unified School District schools
Public high schools in California
1957 establishments in California